Talaat Guenidi (born 26 November 1943) is an Egyptian basketball player. He competed in the men's tournament at the 1972 Summer Olympics.

References

1943 births
Living people
Egyptian men's basketball players
Olympic basketball players of Egypt
Basketball players at the 1972 Summer Olympics
Place of birth missing (living people)